Kenneth Ewart Edgar (24 June 1890 – 20 May 1961) was an Australian rules footballer who played with St Kilda and Melbourne in the Victorian Football League (VFL).

Notes

External links 

 Ken Edgar, ''demonwiki.org.

1890 births
1961 deaths
Australian rules footballers from Melbourne
St Kilda Football Club players
Melbourne Football Club players
People from Flemington, Victoria